John Maxell Stowell (1824–1907) was an American politician in Wisconsin. He served as the 26th Mayor of Milwaukee.

Early life
Stowell was born in Alexander, New York in 1824. He attended Alexander Classical School and Marietta College before moving to Milwaukee, Wisconsin in 1856.

Political career
Stowell was a member of the Wisconsin State Assembly in 1862 before serving as Mayor of Milwaukee from 1882 to 1884. He was a Democrat.

He died in 1907 and is interred in Forest Home Cemetery in Milwaukee.

References

People from Alexander, New York
Mayors of Milwaukee
Democratic Party members of the Wisconsin State Assembly
Marietta College alumni
1824 births
1907 deaths
19th-century American politicians